Sphaerium stuhlmanni is a species of freshwater bivalve in the family Sphaeriidae. It is endemic to Lake Victoria in Kenya, Tanzania and Uganda. It occurs on muddy and sandy bottoms, typically in shallow waters (0–10 m depth) but potentially down to 50 m depth.

References 

stuhlmanni
Freshwater animals of Africa
Molluscs of Africa
Molluscs of Kenya
Invertebrates of Tanzania
Invertebrates of Uganda
Freshwater bivalves
Molluscs described in 1897
Taxa named by Eduard von Martens
Taxonomy articles created by Polbot